Node module may refer to:
Unity (ISS module), an American ISS node
Harmony (ISS module), an American ISS node
Tranquillity (ISS module), an American ISS node
Node 4, a proposed American ISS node
Uzlovoy Module, Nodal Module, a Russian ISS node